is a Japanese baseball manga series written and illustrated by Shinji Mizushima. The original series was serialized in Akita Shoten's shōnen manga magazine Weekly Shōnen Champion from April 24, 1972, to March 27, 1981, but it was followed by several sequel series running until 2018. Chapters of the series were published into 205 tankōbon volumes in total, making it the series with the second highest number of volumes. It was also made into an anime by the same name. It was immensely popular in Japan during its original release, and is one of the most popular sports manga of all time.

Outline

Dokaben is centered on Taro Yamada and his teammates Iwaki, Tonoma, and Satonaka and was focused mainly on their activity as a high school baseball team. At first, it focused on Yamada, Iwaki, and Sachiko and was set in Takaoka Middle School. But in Volume 8 the team is transferred to Meikun High School for their baseball skills.

The story of Dokaben continues in Dai Kōshien, Dokaben Pro Baseball Story, and Dokaben SuperStars Story.

Characters

Meikun High School baseball team

Yamada generation

Position: Catcher

Position: Third baseman

Position: Second baseman

Position: Pitcher

Position: Catcher, Left fielder

Senior / Younger student

Position: Catcher, First baseman

Position: Center fielder

Position: Right fielder

Position: Shortstop

Position: Pitcher

Position: Shortstop, Second baseman

Manager

Manager of Meikun High School baseball team

Yamada family

Taro's 9-year-old little sister

Taro's grandfather
"Ji-chan" means grandpa in English

Rivals

Kanagawa

Kantō

 → Michihiro Ikemizu (ep. 82)

 → Takashi Tanaka

Whole Japan

Others

Iwaki's girlfriend

Shinji Kobayashi's little sister

Manga
When Takehiko Inoue (author of Slam Dunk and Vagabond) was young, he drew a lot of spectacular scene from Dokaben, the first manga he paid.

Cultural references
In the "Simpsons Comics internationale" in issue #132, the Japanese supplement (Too crazy, Juvenile Prankster, BARTOMU! (serialized in "Laughing Laughing everyone is laughing")) opens as a parody of Dokaben, with Bartomu playing for the "Yokohama Li'l Ninjas", and an art style heavily based on Dokaben's highly recognised style of art.

Art style
The art style of Dokaben is very rubbery and motional, with surprisingly dynamic use of speed lines, with a heavy use of black and very straightforward body construction. The motion and Dynamics are highly retained even in reprints. In his book Reinventing Comics, Scott McCloud mentions it as the example of the sports genre, drawing high recognition to the style.

Notes

References

External links
 Official Nippon Animation Dokaben introduction page 
 

1972 manga
1976 anime television series debuts
1983 manga
1995 manga
2004 manga
Akita Shoten manga
Baseball in anime and manga
Fuji TV original programming
Nippon Animation
School life in anime and manga
Shōnen manga